Pudukkottai is home to many schools and colleges.
Government Medical College and Hospital, Pudukkottai
Vidyaa Vikas Higher Secondary School
Agricultural College & Research Institute, Kudumiyanmalai
H. H. The Rajah's College, Pudukkottai
Mookambigai College of Engineering
Mount Zion College of Engineering and Technology
Mount Zion College of Nursing
Valampuri Vaduganathan Higher Secondary School

See also
Education in Tamil Nadu

References 

Education in Pudukkottai district
Pudukkottai